COCONUTS-2 b, or WISEPA J075108.79-763449.6, is a gas giant exoplanet that orbits the M-type star L 34-26. With a mass of 6.3 Jupiters, it takes over one million years to complete one orbit around the star, and it is 6000 AU away from it.

The planet was discovered in 2011 and was initially identified as a T9 free-floating brown dwarf WISEPA J075108.79−763449.6. During the COol Companions ON Ultrawide orbiTS (COCONUTS) survey, its association with L 34-26 was announced in 2021. At a distance of 10.9 pc, COCONUTS-2b is the closest directly imaged exoplanet to Earth known to date.

The researchers found that it is unlikely that COCONUTS-2b was formed inside the protoplanetary disk of the host star and it is more likely that the planet formed on its own via high entropy formation (aka hot-start process).

Atmosphere 
The planet has a spectral type of T9, based on a low signal-to-noise near-infrared spectrum with Magellan/FIRE. This spectral type suggests high amounts of methane, water vapor and low amounts of carbon monoxide in the atmosphere of COCONUTS-2b.

COCONUTS-2b might have both clouds and a non-equilibrium process in its atmosphere.

Due to its large orbital separation, COCONUTS-2b is a great laboratory to study the atmosphere and composition of young gas-giant exoplanets.

Host star 
L 34-26, also known as COCONUTS-2A and TYC 9381-1809-1, is a M3-type dwarf star located 35 light-years away, in the constellation of Chamaeleon. The star is about one-third the mass of the Sun, with an age between 150 and 800 million years old.

Researchers using TESS found that L 34-26 showed stellar flares about every 0.48 days. It was the most active planet hosting star in their sample. The team studying the host star also found that L 34-26 is fast rotating with a rotation period of 2.83 days. The planet should not be influenced by the flares, because of the large orbital separation.

Gallery

References

Exoplanets discovered in 2021
Exoplanets detected by direct imaging
Gas giants